Estádio dos Eucaliptos is a football stadium in Cuíto, Angola.

History
Renovated in June 2005, by Nelson e Filhos, the stadium underwent a new renovation in 2008, this time by NDJ Lda and later on in 2011 by the Chinese company Sinohidro.

References

Football venues in Angola
Bié Province